The National Government of 1935–1937 was formed by Stanley Baldwin on his reappointment as Prime Minister of the United Kingdom by King George V, following the resignation of Ramsay MacDonald in June 1935.

As a National Government it contained members of the Conservative Party, Liberal Nationals and National Labour, as well as a number of individuals who belonged to no political party. The Government oversaw the Edward VIII abdication crisis and three monarchs in 1936. In May 1937, Baldwin resigned and was replaced as Prime Minister by Neville Chamberlain.

Cabinet

1935–1937

Notes
Anthony Eden served as Minister without Portfolio, with specific responsibility for League of Nations Affairs (and was often referred to as "Minister for League of Nations Affairs) for approximately six months; during this time, he enjoyed equal status with the Foreign Secretary (Sir Samuel Hoare) and sat in the cabinet.

List of ministers
Members of the Cabinet are in bold face.

References

 Butler, David, and G. Butler, Twentieth Century British Political Facts 1900–2000
 Hyde, H. Montgomery. Baldwin: The Unexpected Prime Minister (1973)
 Jenkins, Roy.  Baldwin (1987)  excerpt and text search
 Mowat, Charles Loch. Britain Between the Wars, 1918–1940 (1955). online pp 413–79
 Raymond, John, ed. The Baldwin Age (1960), essays by scholars 252 pages; online 
 Smart, Nick.  The National Government. 1931–40 (Macmillan 1999) 
 Taylor, A.J.P. English History 1914–1945 (1965) pp 321–88
 Thorpe, Andrew. Britain in the 1930s. The Deceptive Decade, (Oxford: Blackwell, 1992). 

1930s in the United Kingdom
1935 establishments in the United Kingdom
1937 disestablishments in the United Kingdom
Political history of the United Kingdom
Coalition governments of the United Kingdom
British ministries
Ministries of George V
Ministries of Edward VIII
Ministries of George VI
Ministry 3
Cabinets established in 1935
Cabinets disestablished in 1937
Interwar Britain
1935 in British politics

pl:Trzeci rząd Ramsaya MacDonalda